Quentin Valançon (born 31 March 1989) is a French rugby union player. His position is Centre and he currently plays for Section Paloise (Pau) in the Rugby Pro D2. He began his career with Stade Français, spent a year at Bordeaux Bègles before returning to Paris. He moved to Pau in 2012.

References

1989 births
Living people
French rugby union players
People from Les Lilas
Section Paloise players
Rugby union centres
Stade Français players
Sportspeople from Seine-Saint-Denis